HVDC BorWin3 is a high voltage direct current (HVDC) link under construction to transmit offshore wind power to the power grid of the German mainland.    The project differs from most HVDC systems in that one of the two converter stations is built on a platform in the sea.  Voltage-Sourced Converters with DC ratings of 900 MW, ±320 kV are used and the total cable length is 160 km.  The project is the most recent of the German offshore HVDC projects to be awarded (in 2014).  It is being built by the Siemens/ Petrofac  consortium with the offshore platform contract awarded to Drydocks World in Dubai.  The project is expected to be handed over to its owner, TenneT, in 2019. The project started power transmission in August 2019. TenneT took control of operations in February 2020.

See also

High-voltage direct current
Offshore wind power
HVDC BorWin1
HVDC BorWin2
HVDC DolWin1
HVDC DolWin2
HVDC DolWin3
HVDC HelWin1
HVDC HelWin2
HVDC SylWin1

References

External links 
Description of project on TenneT website (in German).
Description of project on TenneT website (in English).

Electric power transmission systems in Germany
Energy infrastructure under construction
HVDC transmission lines
Wind power in Germany
Electrical interconnectors in the North Sea
2019 establishments in Germany
Energy infrastructure completed in 2019